Battleship Row was the grouping of eight U.S. battleships in port at Pearl Harbor, Hawaii, when the Japanese attacked on 7 December 1941. These ships bore the brunt of the Japanese assault. They were moored next to Ford Island when the attack commenced. A repair ship (former coal ship), was also present, moored next to Arizona.

Creation 
When the United States Navy decided in 1919 to establish a major naval base in Pearl Harbor, the southeastern side of Ford Island was ceded from control of the Army Air Service at the behest of Secretary of War Newton D. Baker. Due to its location in the center of the harbor, where the water was deepest and the potential for maneuvering greater than along the shores, this coast of Ford Island became the de facto mooring location for the Pacific Fleet's battleships and took on the nickname "Battleship Row".

Attack and aftermath

Arizona, California, Oklahoma, and West Virginia were sunk during the attack. Arizona suffered the most serious damage and loss of life, an explosion in a forward magazine breaking the hull in two. Of the other four, West Virginia, and, to a lesser degree, Nevada, had serious damage. Pennsylvania was in dry dock, making attack difficult, and, as a result, was relatively undamaged. Vestal was also damaged. Battleship Row was not visible from Hickam Field because of the thick black smoke. Following the attack, operations immediately commenced to refloat and repair the damaged ships. The first to be completed was Nevada on April 19, 1942.  By the end of the war, all except Arizona and Oklahoma had returned to service.  Each of the six surviving battleships saw service in the Pacific island hopping campaign. Nevada also served in the Atlantic and supported the invasion of Normandy. All six were decommissioned soon after the war was over. Nevada and Pennsylvania were expended in atomic bomb tests in the Pacific.  The rest were scrapped in the late 1950s. Oklahoma was eventually refloated but not repaired, and capsized and sank while being towed back to the mainland for scrapping.  Arizonas hull remains a memorial, one of the most popular tourist attractions on the island.

  was in port at Pearl Harbor, but was not moored with the rest of the battleships, as she had since been converted to a target ship. However, she was still sunk within a few minutes of the battle.

Ships that were attacked
 : (flagship of Battleship Division One) hit by an armor-piercing bomb, exploded; total loss. 1,177 dead.
 :  hit by five torpedoes, capsized; total loss. 429 dead. Refloated November 1943; capsized and lost while under tow to the mainland May 1947.
 : hit by two bombs, seven torpedoes, sunk; returned to service July 1944. 106 dead.
 : hit by two bombs, two torpedoes, sunk; returned to service January 1944. 100 dead.
 : hit by six bombs, one torpedo, beached; returned to service October 1942. 60 dead.
 : hit by two bombs; returned to service February 1942. 5 dead.
 : hit by two bombs; returned to service February 1942. 4 dead (including floatplane pilot shot down).
  (flagship of the U.S. Pacific Fleet): in drydock with Cassin and Downes, hit by one bomb, debris from USS Cassin; remained in service. 9 dead.
 : hit by two torpedoes, capsized; total loss. 64 dead. Was commissioned as a target ship at the time of the attack and was docked on the west side of Ford Island, opposite Battleship Row.

See also

 USS Arizona Memorial
Pearl Harbor National Memorial

References

Attack on Pearl Harbor
World War II battleships of the United States